Scigliano is a small town and comune located in the hills in the province of Cosenza in the Calabria region of southern Italy. It is the birthplace of 16th century Italian humanist Giovanni Valentino Gentile.

See also
 Savuto river
 George A. Scigliano

References

Cities and towns in Calabria